is a Japanese actor and voice artist from the Tokyo Metropolitan area.

Biography

Filmography

Anime
2003
 Sonic X (Espio)
2004
 The Prince of Tennis (Masaharu Niou)
 Yu-Gi-Oh! GX (Daichi Misawa)
2005
 Idaten Jump (Masa)
 Ginga Legend Weed (Kyōshirō)
2006
 Eyeshield 21 (Riku Kaitani)
 Kekkaishi (Yoshiro Takemitsu)
 Strain: Strategic Armored Infantry (Colin)
 Tokko (Ajiro)
 Musashi Gundoh (Kirigakure Saizō)
 Red Garden (Luke)
2007
 Moribito: Guardian of the Spirit (Sune)
2008
 Kure-nai (Tadashi Kunō)
 True Tears (Jun Isurugi)
 Persona: Trinity Soul (Watanabe)
2010
 Angel Beats! (Fujimaki)
 Katekyo Hitman Reborn (G)
 Night Raid 1931 (Kiyoshi Mitani)
 Yu-Gi-Oh! 5D's (Breo)
2011
 Kamisama Dolls (Fujima, Torimasa)
2012
 The New Prince of Tennis (Masaharu Niou)

Original video animation
 The Prince of Tennis series (Masaharu Niō)
 Red Garden: Dead Girls (Luke)

Film animation
 Only Yesterday (Shuji Hirota)

Video games
 Bladestorm: The Hundred Years' War (Charles VII of France)
 The Prince of Tennis series (Masaharu Niou)

Dubbing
 City of God (Bené (Phellipe Haagensen))
 One Tree Hill (Lucas Scott (Chad Michael Murray))
 Shameless (Lip Gallagher (Jeremy Allen White))
 Untraceable (Owen Reilly (Joseph Cross))

Live-action
 Battle Royale (Hiroshi Kuronaga)

References

External links
 Official blog 
 
 

1979 births
Living people
Japanese male child actors
Japanese male video game actors
Japanese male voice actors
Male voice actors from Tokyo
20th-century Japanese male actors
21st-century Japanese male actors